The following is a list of the exports of Japan. Data is for 2012-2016, in millions of United States dollars, as reported by The Observatory of Economic Complexity. Currently the exports contributing at least 0.67% to total export in any year are listed.

References
 atlas.media.mit.edu - Observatory of Economic complexity - Products exported by Japan (2012)

Foreign trade of Japan
Japan
Exports